"Look at Us" is a song co-written and recorded by American country music artist Vince Gill.  It was released in September 1991 as the third single from the album Pocket Full of Gold.  The song reached number 4 on the Billboard Hot Country Singles & Tracks chart. Gill wrote the song with Max D. Barnes.

Content
"Look at Us" features a pedal steel guitar intro from John Hughey, who was known for his "crying steel" method of playing by using the higher ranges of the instrument. Of this solo, Gill said that it "makes that song recognizable by what happens before any words even get sung."

Other versions
John Prine recorded the song as a duet with Morgane Stapleton as part of his 2016 album For Better, or Worse. Deana Carter also performed a cover to celebrate 50 years of the CMA Awards.

Music video
The music video was directed by John Lloyd Miller and premiered in late 1991. It contains videos and photographs of several long-timed married couples, still in love. The video featured Gill's ex wife (Janis Oliver Gill) - they later divorced in 1997.

Chart performance

References

1991 singles
Vince Gill songs
John Prine songs
Songs written by Vince Gill
Songs written by Max D. Barnes
Song recordings produced by Tony Brown (record producer)
MCA Records singles
Music videos directed by John Lloyd Miller
1991 songs